Marina TV, or Marina Television, is a satellite television channel that broadcasts to the Middle East in high definition via Nilesat on the frequency 11555 vertical. It is a visual radio platform with TV programs that are entirely produced for the channel.

First Broadcast 
Marina TV's first broadcast was in April 2015 for radio shows on MarinaFM like Nagham AlSabah, Noon, Dewaniya, and Refresh.

Content 
MarinaTV is the first visual radio in the Middle East that broadcasts from a radio studio in Marina Mall located in Salmiya City.

Studio 
The studio is equipped for TV and radio, in addition to a control room that operates shows and reruns for 24 hours daily.

Mass media in Kuwait City
Satellite television